The 1984–85 Fairleigh Dickinson Knights men's basketball team represented Fairleigh Dickinson University during the 1984–85 NCAA Division I men's basketball season. The team was led by second-year head coach Tom Green. The Knights played their home games at the FDU Gym in Hackensack, New Jersey as members of the ECAC Metro Conference.

The Knights compiled a 21–10 record and went 10–4 in ECAC Metro play to finish in second place. They defeated Robert Morris, Long Island, and Loyola (MD) to capture the ECAC Metro tournament championship as the 2-seed. By winning the ECAC Metro tournament, the Knights received the conference's automatic bid to the NCAA tournament as No. 16 seed in the Southeast region. The Knights lost a close game to 1-seed Michigan, 59–55, in the opening round.

Roster

Schedule and results

|- 
!colspan=9 style=| Regular season  

|-
!colspan=9 style=| ECAC Metro tournament

|-
!colspan=9 style=| NCAA tournament

References

Fairleigh Dickinson Knights men's basketball seasons
Fairleigh Dickinson
Fairleigh Dickinson
Fairleigh Dickinson
Fairleigh Dickinson